Aeromicrobium ginsengisoli is a Gram-positive, non-spore-forming and non-motile bacterium from the genus Aeromicrobium which has been isolated from soil from a ginseng field in Daejeon, Korea.

References 

Propionibacteriales
Bacteria described in 2008